Raymundo King de la Rosa (born 18 December 1976) is a Mexican politician affiliated with the PRI. He currently serves as Deputy of the LXII Legislature of the Mexican Congress representing Quintana Roo.

References

1976 births
Living people
Politicians from Quintana Roo
People from Chetumal, Quintana Roo
Institutional Revolutionary Party politicians
21st-century Mexican politicians
Universidad del Valle de México alumni
Deputies of the LXII Legislature of Mexico
Members of the Chamber of Deputies (Mexico) for Quintana Roo
20th-century Mexican people